Merrylands West is a suburb in western Sydney, New South Wales, Australia.

Geography
Merrylands West is located 23 kilometres west of the Sydney central business district in the local government area of the Cumberland City Council. The eastern part of Merrylands West is known locally as "Hilltop".

Commercial area
Merrylands West contains several schools – Merrylands High School, Cerdon College- an all-girls school, as well as Hilltop Road and  Sherwood Grange Public Schools.  There is a retirement community, Cardinal Gilroy Village, situated on 45 Barcom Street, behind the high schools.  The suburb is commercially serviced by a small shopping centre comprising a supermarket and fast food outlets. Merrylands West also contains the Central Gardens – a small wildlife park in Sydney's west.

Transport
There are two T-way stops in Merrylands West – the Sherwood stop near the main intersection, and the Canal stop in front of the two high schools. The area is also serviced by other local bus companies.

References

Suburbs of Sydney
Cumberland Council, New South Wales